Vilnis Baltiņš (born 30 April 1942 in Ugāle parish) is a Latvian sports executive and a former Latvian Soviet sprint canoeist. He was the first president of the renewed Latvian Olympic Committee (1988-2004). As canoeist, he competed in the mid to late 1960s. He won a gold medal in the K-1 4 x 500 m event at the 1966 ICF Canoe Sprint World Championships in East Berlin.

References

Living people
Soviet male canoeists
ICF Canoe Sprint World Championships medalists in kayak
Latvian male canoeists
1942 births
Latvian sports executives and administrators